Josephine Nkrumah is a Ghanaian lawyer who currently serves as the chairperson of the National Commission for Civic Education in Ghana.

Education 
Nkrumah has a Bachelor of Arts degree in Law and French from the University of Ghana, Legon. She was called to the Ghana Bar in February 1997. She also holds a Master's of Law (LLM) Degree from the International Maritime Law Institute (IMO), Malta, specializing in Maritime Law.

Career 
Nkrumah was appointed by John Mahama to serve as the deputy chairperson for the National Commission for Civic Education (NCCE) in Ghana in 2015 in charge of Finance and Administration. She was subsequently promoted by John Mahama to serve as the Chairperson of the National Commission for Civic Education in Ghana in 2016 after the chairperson, Charlotte Osei was appointed to be the Chairperson of the Electoral Commission.

References 

Living people
Ghanaian women lawyers
Ghana School of Law alumni
University of Ghana alumni
Year of birth missing (living people)
International Maritime Law Institute alumni
21st-century Ghanaian lawyers